Ahmed Saber (born 11 April 1968) is an Egyptian retired professional footballer who played as a goalkeeper.

Club career
Saber spent his all professional career in the Egyptian Premier League with Al Mokawloon Al Arab.

International career
Saber earned his first and only senior cap for Egypt in a friendly game away against Ghana on 3 December 1997.
He was also a part of Egypt national football team at the 1998 African Cup of Nations.

Honours
National Team
 Winner of African Cup of Nations Burkina Faso 1998.

References

1968 births
Living people
Al Mokawloon Al Arab SC players
Egyptian footballers
Egypt international footballers
Association football goalkeepers
1998 African Cup of Nations players
Egyptian Premier League players